Hinnøya is the fourth-largest island in Norway, and the largest outside the Svalbard archipelago. The  lies just off the western coast of Northern Norway.  The island sits on the border of Nordland and Troms og Finnmark counties. The western part of the island is in the district of Vesterålen, the southwestern part is in the Lofoten district, the southeastern part is in the Ofoten district, and the northeastern part is in Troms.
, Hinnøya had a population of 32,688.  The only town on the island is the town of Harstad. Some of the larger villages include Borkenes, Lødingen, Sigerfjord, and Sørvik. The island is split between the municipalities of Harstad, Tjeldsund and Kvæfjord in Troms og Finnmark county, as well as Andøy, Hadsel, Lødingen, Sortland, and Vågan in Nordland county.

Etymology

The Old Norse form of the name was just Hinn (the suffix -øya meaning "the island" was added later). The large island is almost divided in two parts by the Gullesfjorden and Kanstadfjorden, and the old name is probably derived from an old verb with the meaning "cleave", "split", or "cut".

Transportation
Hinnøya is connected to the mainland by the Tjeldsund Bridge across the Tjeldsundet strait. 
To the west, it is connected to the island of Langøya by the Sortland Bridge, and to the northwest to the island of Andøya by the Andøy Bridge. It is connected to the Lofoten islands by the Lofoten mainland connection which opened on 1 December 2007. That connection is part of the European Route E10 highway. The highway runs near Møysalen National Park. There is also a ferry connection in the southeast between the village of Lødingen and the village of Bognes on the mainland, crossing the Vestfjorden.

Geography

Hinnøya is dissected by several fjords, and two very long ones, Gullesfjorden in the northeast and Øksfjorden in the southwest, almost sever the island in half. There is a  isthmus between innermost parts of the two fjords. Tjeldsundet sound divides Hinnøya from the mainland and from Tjeldøya; the narrow Raftsundet strait divides Hinnøya from Austvågøya and between Hinnøya and Andøya goes Risøyrenna strait. The island contains a mostly rugged and mountainous terrain, especially the southern part. There are also valleys and lakes, the largest lake is Storvatnet at 6,67 km². The treeline lies close to 400 m above sea level, but varies from 250 m to nearly 500 m above sea level. 

The best agricultural area is in the northeast, in Harstad and Kvæfjord Municipalities. In the northwestern part of the island, near the village of Forfjord, there is a nature reserve containing a valley with forests and bogs, including the oldest pine trees in Norway, more than 700 years old.

Climate
The climate of the southern coast of the island is warmer and wetter in winter than the northern coast. Harstad, situated on the northern part of Hinnøya, has all-time high  recorded July 2014, and record low  recorded in February 2010.

See also

List of islands of Norway

References

External links

Wildlife of the Hinnøya region

Northern Norway
Islands of Troms og Finnmark
Islands of Nordland
Ofoten
Lofoten
Vesterålen
Andøy
Hadsel
Harstad
Kvæfjord
Lødingen
Sortland
Tjeldsund
Vågan